The Marlstone Rock Formation is a geological formation in England. It dates to the Early Jurassic, it consists of "Sandy, shell-fragmental and ooidal ferruginous limestone interbedded with ferruginous calcareous sandstone, and generally subordinate ferruginous mudstone beds", with ironstone.

References

Geologic formations of England
Jurassic England
Early Jurassic Europe
Pliensbachian Stage
Toarcian Stage
Formations
Jurassic System of Europe